Konkovo may refer to:

 Konkovo District, an administrative district (raion) of South-Western Administrative Okrug, Moscow, Russia
 Konkovo (Moscow Metro), a station on the Kaluzhsko-Rizhskaya Line of the Moscow Metro
 Konkovo (Novgorod Oblast), Russia
 Konkovo (Ukraine), a place in Donetsk Oblast, Ukraine